Rosemary Rowena Cooper (born 1935) is a British actress.

She began her career in 1956, joining the Radio Drama Company by winning the Carlton Hobbs Bursary. In 1959 she joined the Dundee Repertory Theatre Company and went on to have an extensive career, primarily in British television, for over 50 years. Cooper starred in The Rag Trade as Mrs Fenner.

Select filmography in television

Personal life
She married actor Terrence Hardiman in 1964.

Notes

External links

Actors from Harare
British television actresses
1935 births
Living people
Date of birth missing (living people)
Rhodesian emigrants to the United Kingdom
White Rhodesian people